Sidhartha Siva (born 5 May 1985) is an Indian film director, producer, actor, screenwriter and lyricist, who works in Malayalam cinema.

Early life
His hometown is Kaviyoor in Kerala. He is the son of filmmaker Kaviyoor Sivaprasad.

Film career
He started his film career by directing telefilms and short films. He then appeared  in Thirakkadha, Ivar Vivahitharayal, Bodyguard, Puthiya Theerangal, Kudumbasree Travels, Artist, Omega.Exe, Rithu, Tejabhaai & Family, Sahasram, Calendar, Sagar Elias Jacky, Radio Jockey, On the Way, Central Theater, Ayaalum Njanum Thammil, Vikramaadhithyan,  Love 24 X 7, Kadhantharam , Kali, Take Off, Njandukalude Naattil Oridavela, Adam Joan, etc.
He won his first National Film Awards at the 60th National Film Awards, he won the Indira Gandhi Award for Best Debut Film of a Director for his film 101 Chodyangal (2012). The film also won the Silver Crow Pheasant Award for Best Feature Film (Audience Prize) at the 18th International Film Festival of Kerala. 101 Chodyangal also won the best feature film award at Noida international film festival. Siva also won the Mohan Raghavan Award for Best Director, 2013. 101 Chodyangalwas also selected in Indian Panorama section at International Film Festival of India 2013.

In 2014, his film Zahir was screened at 19th Busan International Film Festival.

His film Ain won the  best feature film in Malayalam at 62nd National Film Awards. Ain also won the prestigious Padmarajan Puraskaram for Best film and Best script. Ain bagged the Kerala State Film Award for best Story in 2014.

Awards

 National Film Awards

 2013: Indira Gandhi Award for Best Debut Film of a Director - 101 Chodyangal
 2015: Best Feature Film in Malayalam - Ain

 Kerala State Film Awards

 2015: Best Story - Ain
 2020: Best Director - Ennivar

 Other awards

 2013: Silver Pheasant at the International Film Festival of Kerala - 101 Chodyangal
 2014: John Abraham Cinema Award
 2015: Chitra Bharathi Puraskar at the  Bengaluru International Film Festival - Ain
 2015: Padmarajan Puraskaram- Ain
 2020: Best Director Kerala Film Critics Association Awards- Ennivar
 2020: GARFI Award - Best Film  Ennivar
 2020: J C Daniel Foundation Award - Best Film  Ennivar
 2020: J C Daniel Foundation Award - Best Director  Ennivar
 2021: Padmarajan Puraskaram- Aanu

Filmography 

 As a director

 As an Actor

Television

Best Actor (Amrita TV)
Apradhana Varthakal (Amrita TV)
Marimayam (Mazhavil Manorama)

Books

Nirangalude Jathakakatha (Collection of Poems) 2005
101 Chodyangal (Screen Play) 2015
Kure Gunithangalum Haranangalum (Collection of Poems) 2015
Onnam Number Platform (Collection of Short Stories) 2021

References

External links

Official Facebook page

1985 births
Living people
Male actors from Kerala
Male actors from Pathanamthitta
Male actors in Malayalam cinema
Indian male film actors
Malayalam film directors
Malayalam screenwriters
People from Thiruvalla
Screenwriters from Kerala
Film producers from Kerala
Film directors from Kerala
Malayalam film producers
21st-century Indian film directors
Director whose film won the Best Debut Feature Film National Film Award